Vanessa Jackeline Gómez Peretti (born March 21, 1986) is a model and Miss Venezuela International 2006.

Peretti was the first deaf woman to compete in the Miss Venezuela pageant, when she represented the Sucre state. She competed in Miss International 2007 on October 15 in Japan against another deaf woman, Sophie Vouzelaud from France.

See also
 Ly Jonaitis
 Claudia Suárez
 Dayana Mendoza

References

External links
Miss Venezuela Official Website
Miss International Official Website
Vanessa in BellasVenezolanas.org

1986 births
Living people
People from Cumaná
Miss International 2007 delegates
Miss Venezuela International winners
Venezuelan female models
Deaf beauty pageant contestants
Venezuelan deaf people
20th-century Venezuelan women
21st-century Venezuelan women